The 1976 Sabah earthquake occurred at 10:56 am on 26 July near Lahad Datu in the eastern portion of Sabah, Malaysia. The moment magnitude 6.3 earthquake is one of the strongest in Malaysia to be recorded by seismic instruments. It had a focal mechanism corresponding to strike-slip faulting. While slightly larger than the 2015 Sabah earthquake ( 6.0), the 1976 event caused less extensive damage, in the form of cracks on several buildings and ground cracks.

See also
 List of earthquakes in 1976
 List of earthquakes in Malaysia
 Seismic activity of Malaysia

References

External links

1976 earthquakes
1976 in Malaysia
Earthquakes in Malaysia
1976 Earthquake